DHC Sokol Poruba is a Czech women's handball club from Ostrava's Poruba district originally established as BK Ostrava (a.k.a. Cosmetic Ostrava for sponsorship reasons) in 1997. BK Ostrava won the national championship in its two first seasons, taking part in the Champions League. In 2010 it was disbanded and refounded, taking its current name. 

In 2012 the team won its third league. The 2012–13 EHF Cup will mark its debut in EHF competitions under its current form.

Titles
 Czech League
 1997, 1998, 2012

European record

References

Sokol Poruba
Sokol Poruba
Handball clubs established in 1997
1997 establishments in the Czech Republic